Malcolm Stevens Parcell (January 1, 1896 – March 25, 1987) was an American artist who won the 1925 Carnegie Prize.

Biography
He was born on January 1, 1896, in Claysville, Pennsylvania to a Baptist minister and later attended Carnegie Institute of Technology. He was known for landscapes and portraits. Six of his murals grace the walls of the Pioneer Room at the George Washington Hotel in Washington, Pennsylvania. In 1937 he married Helen Louise Gallagher (1897–1984), a school teacher who had modelled for many of his paintings. His brother, Evans Parcell, was a magazine illustrator. He died on March 25, 1987.

References

External links
https://collection.cmoa.org/?creator=Malcolm%20Parcell&page=1&perPage=10&view=grid a collection of his works can be seen here
Artwork by Malcolm Parcell

1896 births
1987 deaths
Carnegie Mellon University alumni
20th-century American painters
American male painters